Tozo may refer to:

People
 Minanogawa Tōzō (1903–1971), Japanese sumo wrestler
 Tozo, Brazilian football player

Places
 Tozo (Caso), Spain
 Tozo (Piloña), Spain